The State Anthem of the Turkmen SSR was adopted in 1946 and used until 1991 by the Turkmen SSR as a regional anthem. When Turkmenistan became an independent state in 1991, the regional anthem became the national anthem of Turkmenistan, and was used as such until late 27 September 1996, although without lyrics, as the Soviet-era lyrics were discontinued upon Turkmenistan's independence from the Soviet Union.

Background

It was used from 1946 to 1996. The music was composed by Veli Mukhatov, who also composed the current national anthem of Turkmenistan; and the lyrics were written by Aman Kekilov and a group of authors. On 12 April 1978, the original lyrics were changed to remove mentions of Joseph Stalin. After Turkmenistan's independence was declared, its melody was still used until late 1996. However, there were no lyrics in the new version.

Lyrics

1978-1991 Version

1946-1978 Version

Notes

References

External links
 Instrumental recording in MP3 format (1946-1991, Full version)
 Instrumental recording in MP3 format (1946-1991, Short version)
 Instrumental recording in MP3 format (1991-1996, post-Soviet)
MIDI file
Vocal recording in MP3 format
Lyrics - nationalanthems.info
(1946 version)

Turkmen SSR
Turkmenistan music
National symbols of Turkmenistan
Turkmen Soviet Socialist Republic